Aspects of America is a classical music album recorded by the Oregon Symphony under the direction of Carlos Kalmar, released by Pentatone on September 7, 2018. Featured works include: Magiya by Sean Shepherd, Microsymph by Sebastian Currier, Supplica by Christopher Rouse, Aspects of an Elephant by Kenji Bunch, and Souvenirs by Samuel Barber.

Reception
Jonathan Blumhofer of The Arts Fuse said the recording "is at once superbly played, astutely programmed, and aesthetically necessary". He called "Magiya" "a spirited, blazingly colorful, seven-minute overture that brims with striking gestures and elegant musical ideas dressed up in a brilliant orchestration and never overstaying its welcome".

The album helped earn Blanton Alspaugh a Grammy Award for Producer of the Year, Classical.

Track listing
 "Magiya", Sean Shepherd - 7:14
 "Microsymph", Sebastian Currier - 12:33
 "Supplica", Christopher Rouse - 14:11
Aspects of an Elephant, Kenji Bunch
Introduction. Into Darkness - 2:18
 Var. 1, The Elephant Is a Whip - 1:44
 Var. 2, The Elephant Is a Spear - 1:38
 Var. 3, The Elephant Is a Silk Cloth - 2:30
 Var. 4, The Elephant Is a Tree - 2:02
 Var. 5, The Elephant Is a Snake - 1:43
 Var. 6, The Elephant Is a Throne - 1:55
 The Argument - 1:34
 Finale. The Creature Revealed - 6:21
Souvenirs, Op. 28 (Version for Orchestra), Samuel Barber
I. Waltz  - 4:05
 II. Schottische - 2:24
 III. Pas de deux - 4:38
 IV. Two-Step - 1:53
 V. Hesitation-Tango - 3:52
 VI. Galop - 2:42

Track listing adapted from the iTunes Store.

See also

 2018 in classical music

References

External links
 

2018 albums
Albums recorded at the Arlene Schnitzer Concert Hall
Oregon Symphony albums
PentaTone Classics albums